Hanna is a town in east-central Alberta, Canada.

History 
The town was first settled in 1912 and was incorporated in 1914. It was named after David Blyth Hanna, the third vice president of the Canadian Northern Railway. It was a division point of the Canadian Northern Railway and had a 10-stall railway roundhouse.

Demographics 

In the 2016 Census of Population conducted by Statistics Canada, the Town of Hanna recorded a population of 2,559 living in 1,149 of its 1,246 total private dwellings, a  change from its 2011 population of 2,673.

Economy 
The town's main industries are agriculture, oil production, power generation, tourism, and coal mining. It is the centre of a large trading area called Short Grass County and is the home of approximately 200 businesses. Natural resources in the Hanna area are coal, petroleum, natural gas, and bentonite.

Notable people 
Chad Kroeger, Mike Kroeger, and Ryan Peake, members of the rock band Nickelback
Shirley McClellan, former provincial politician
Lanny McDonald, former professional hockey player and member of the NHL Hall of Fame
Glen Motz, Conservative MP for Medicine Hat—Cardston—Warner
Blake Nill, former professional football player
Jim Nill, former professional hockey player
Milt Pahl, former provincial politician
Dave Ruhl, former professional wrestler
Marjorie Willison, author and radio personality

Sister town 
Wake, Okayama is the sister town of Hanna.

References

External links 

1912 establishments in Alberta
Special Area No. 2
Towns in Alberta
Populated places established in 1912